"Stage 5" is the 79th episode of the HBO television series The Sopranos, the second episode of the second half of the show's sixth season, and the 14th episode of the season overall. It was written by Terence Winter and directed by Alan Taylor, and originally aired on April 15, 2007.

Starring
 James Gandolfini as Tony Soprano
 Lorraine Bracco as Dr. Jennifer Melfi
 Edie Falco as Carmela Soprano
 Michael Imperioli as Christopher Moltisanti
 Dominic Chianese as Corrado Soprano, Jr. *
 Steven Van Zandt as Silvio Dante
 Tony Sirico as Paulie Gualtieri
 Robert Iler as Anthony Soprano, Jr.
 Jamie-Lynn Sigler as Meadow Soprano
 Aida Turturro as Janice Soprano Baccalieri
 Steven R. Schirripa as Bobby Baccalieri
 Vincent Curatola as Johnny "Sack" Sacrimoni
 Frank Vincent as Phil Leotardo
 Ray Abruzzo as Little Carmine Lupertazzi
 Sharon Angela as Rosalie Aprile
 Dan Grimaldi as Patsy Parisi

* = credit only

Guest starring
 Jerry Adler as Hesh Rabkin

Also guest starring

Synopsis
Johnny Sack is transferred to a prison hospital after being diagnosed with small-cell lung cancer. He dies with his wife and two daughters at his bedside. In New York, Phil Leotardo forgoes leadership of the Lupertazzi family in favor of his protégé, Gerry Torciano. However, at dinner in a restaurant with Silvio, Gerry is killed on the orders of Faustino "Doc" Santoro. Tony, furious that Sil was put in danger, urges Little Carmine to vie again for control of the Lupertazzis. Carmine declines; his wife has said, "I don't want to be the wealthiest widow on Long Island."

On what would have been Billy's 47th birthday, Phil bitterly speaks to Butch about his "weakness", in particular after Billy was killed; he says there will be no more compromise.

Meadow has broken up with Finn, while Blanca is getting fed up with A.J. Tony is approached by FBI agents Harris and Goddard, who ask him to pass on anything he notices at the Newark docks that might concern terrorism. Tony turns his back on them.

Christopher finishes his Mafia-themed slasher film, Cleaver. Following the film's premiere in New York City, Tony congratulates Christopher and mingles with the Lupertazzis and the cast at the after-party. Tony does not see it at first, but Carmela notes a similarity between the film's love triangle and Chris, Tony and Adriana, seeing the violent murder of the antagonist as Chris's "revenge fantasy" against Tony. Carmela confronts Chris; he denies any similarities but is worried about what Tony might think.

Chris asks his screenwriter, J.T. Dolan, to tell Tony that the character was his idea. When J.T. refuses, Chris hits him over the head with a Humanitas Prize trophy. J.T. then visits the Bada Bing and tells Tony that he stole the characters and plot from the film Born Yesterday. Tony seems to doubt J.T.'s account, but watches Born Yesterday at home. Later, he painfully admits to Dr. Melfi that he believes Christopher despises him, and that Cleaver illustrates his hatred. He recalls being a father figure to Christopher. Melfi asks Tony to cautiously evaluate if he is not "reading into things," but he replies that his sessions with her have taught him enough about the human subconscious.

At the baptism of Christopher's daughter, Tony and Chris embrace closely, but their eyes belie the closeness.

Deceased
 Gerardo "Gerry" Torciano: shot multiple times to death in a restaurant by a hitman on orders from Faustino "Doc" Santoro, to remove him from contention to the Lupertazzi family boss' position.
 John "Johnny Sack" Sacrimoni: dies of lung cancer in prison.

Final appearance
 "Stage 5" marks the final appearance of the character Lawrence "Larry Boy" Barese, a DiMeo/Soprano family capo. Larry is only mentioned in future episodes.

Title reference
 After being told that his cancer has advanced to stage IV, Johnny Sack correctly guesses there is no stage V.
 The title could also refer to the fifth stage of grief (acceptance), as Johnny Sack accepts his fate after the doctor gives him his diagnosis and prognosis.

Production
 Series writer and executive producer Matthew Weiner appears for the second time in the series as Mafia expert/author Manny Safier, this time on Geraldo Rivera's show.
 HBO released a mockumentary "Behind the Scenes" look at Cleaver titled Making Cleaver the week before the episode was released. It featured in-character interviews with Christopher, Little Carmine, director Morgan Yam, and actors Daniel Baldwin and Jonathan La Paglia, and the head make-up specialist. The mockumentary is included in The Sopranos Season 6 Part 2 DVD set and the Complete Series DVD collection.

References to prior episodes
 In what seems to be an Easter egg, in the climactic scene in Cleaver, just before Sally Boy is killed by Michael, there is a detailed camera shot of a car's rear-view mirror under which, along with the crucifix necklace, hangs the same key chain that Furio Giunta brought back from Italy for A.J. as a souvenir in the season 4 episode, "The Strong, Silent Type." Little Carmine explains to his daughter Alexandra that it represents "the sacred and the propane" (mistaking the common phrase "the sacred and the profane").
 Christopher's new NA sponsor reminds Christopher of what a poor condition of drug use relapse he was at the time when he came into an NA meeting "with a woman," referring to Christopher and Julianna Skiff's affair in "Kaisha," which ended when they broke up and decided to attend an NA meeting.
 Carmela believes the character of Sally Boy had sex with the protagonist's fiancée in Cleaver because of Christopher's belief Tony had intercourse with Adriana La Cerva behind his back, which refers to the season 5 episode "Irregular Around the Margins."
When toasting the memory of Johnny "Sack," Paulie says, "Ride the painted pony, let the spinning wheel glide," which is a misquote of a line from the Blood, Sweat & Tears song "Spinning Wheel". This song appeared earlier as Muzak in "The Happy Wanderer", when Richie Aprile collects his vig from David Scatino.

Other cultural references
 Christopher tells his Narcotics Anonymous sponsor he based his revenge-seeking character on Edward Scissorhands—with a cleaver replacing the scissors (although he had at one point considered a ball-peen hammer).
 Christopher says that they might have to change the title of Cleaver as the Eldridge Cleaver estate is seeking an injunction.
 Phil Leotardo asks children at his late brother's birthday commemoration about Leonardo da Vinci. One of the kids incorrectly guesses he was the author of The Da Vinci Code.

Music
 An instrumental version of the song "Thank You" by Dido is playing in the diner when Chris is talking to Eddie Dunne.
 Paulie's ringtone, heard during the showing of Christopher's film, is the Simon and Garfunkel song "Cecilia".
 The song-poem played at the end of the episode and over the credits is "Evidently Chickentown" by John Cooper Clarke, from the album Snap, Crackle & Bop.

References

External links
"Stage 5"  at HBO

2007 American television episodes
The Sopranos (season 6) episodes
Television episodes written by Terence Winter